Paweł Sarna may refer to:

Paweł Sarna (poet) (born 1977), Polish poet
Paweł Sarna (canoeist) (born 1984), Polish slalom canoeist